Charles Emery may refer to:

 Charles Edward Emery (1838–1898), civil engineer
 Charles E. Emery, American football coach